Verticordia tumida, commonly known as summer featherflower, is a flowering plant in the myrtle family, Myrtaceae and is endemic to the north-west of Western Australia. It is an open shrub with very small leaves and clusters of deep pink flowers from late spring to early winter.

Description

Flowering time is from late October to April, sometimes later.

Taxonomy and naming
Verticordia tumida was first formally described by Alex George in 1991 from a specimen collected near Tammin by Charles Gardner. The description was published in Nuytsia. The specific epithet (tumida) is a Latin words meaning "swollen" referring to the appendages on the hypanthium.

George placed this species in subgenus Eperephes, section Verticordella along with V. halophila, V. pennigera, V. blepharophylla, V. lindleyi, V. carinata, V. attenuata, V. drummondii, V. wonganensis, V. paludosa, V. luteola, V. bifimbriata, V. mitodes, V. centipeda, V. auriculata, V. pholidophylla, V. spicata and V. hughanii.

There are two subspecies:
 Verticordia tumida A.S.George  subsp. tumida which has 9 or 10 lobes on each of the sepals and a constriction at the base of the floral cup;
 Verticordia tumida subsp. therogana  A.S.George  which 5 to 8 sepal lobes and no constriction of the floral cup.

Distribution and habitat
Subspecies tumida usually grows in sand, sometimes with loam and clay, in heath and shrubland and mainly occurs between Dowerin, Jitarning and Koolyanobbing. Subspecies therogana grows in sand, often with loam in heath and shrubland between Wickepin and the Peak Charles and the Fitzgerald River National Parks.

Conservation
Both subspecies of V. tumida are classified as "Not Threatened" by the Western Australian Government Department of Parks and Wildlife.

Use in horticulture
Subspecies therogana has been propagated from cuttings more easily than has subsp. tumida. It is also easier to maintain in the garden but not to the degree that it is available in commercial horticulture.

References

tumida
Endemic flora of Western Australia
Myrtales of Australia
Rosids of Western Australia
Vulnerable flora of Australia
Plants described in 1991